Jerry may refer to:

Animals
 Jerry (Grand National winner), racehorse, winner of the 1840 Grand National
 Jerry (St Leger winner), racehorse, winner of 1824 St Leger Stakes

Arts, entertainment, and media
 Jerry (film), a 2006 Indian film
 Jerry (play), a 1914 American play
 "Jerry", a song from the album Young and Free by Rock Goddess
 Tom and Jerry (disambiguation)
 Jerry (The Walking Dead), a fictional character from  The Walking Dead

People
 Jerry (given name), including a list of people and fictional characters with the name
 Harold A. Jerry, Jr. (1920–2001), New York politician
 Thomas Jeremiah (d. 1775), commonly known simply as "Jerry", a free Negro in colonial South Carolina

Places
 Branche à Jerry, a tributary of the Baker River in Quebec and New Brunswick, Canada
 Jerry, Washington, a community in the United States

Other uses
 Jerry (company)
 Jerry (WWII), Allied nickname for Germans, originally from WWI but widely used in World War II
 Jerry Rescue (1851), involving American slave William Henry, who called himself "Jerry"

See also 
 Geri (disambiguation)
 Gerry, a given name and surname
 Jeri, a given name and surname
 Jèrri, the name of Jersey in the local language Jèrriais
 Jerrycan, a robust fuel container made from pressed steel
 Jerry's (disambiguation)